Vrbnik is a village and a municipality on the east coast of the island of Krk. The village is perched on a limestone outcropping 50 m above the Adriatic Sea.

Vrbnik is naturally separated from mainland Croatia by the Vinodol Channel, where the towns of Crikvenica and Novi Vinodolski can be observed across the sea. Since 1980 the island has been connected to mainland Croatia via the Krk Bridge.

Originally a walled town, Vrbnik was established in medieval times. According to the 2011 census, the settlement of Vrbnik itself has a population of 948 with a total of 1,260 people in the municipality, which includes three other nearby villages; Garica with 156 inhabitants, Kampelje with 8 inhabitants and Risika with 148 inhabitants .

Culture
The Vrbnik Statute was written in 1388, and confirms the status of Vrbnik as an administrative and political center. The town is also known through the folk song "Verbniče nad moren" or "Verbniče nad moru" (Oh Vrbnik over the Sea), sung as far away as White Carniola in Slovenia.

Places of cultural significance include the Vitezić library, the Gothic Chapel of the Rosary and the Chapel of St. John in the Parish Church of the Assumption, and a collection of ancient manuscripts and Glagolitic manuscripts housed at the parish church.

Vrbnik is known for its indigenous varietal of white wine called Žlahtina.

Notable residents
 Josip Bozanić - Archbishop of Zagreb, Cardinal-Priest of Saint Jerome of the Croats
 Zlatko Sudac - Roman Catholic Priest, known for his Stigmata

Photo gallery

References

External links
Map of Krk and of the city of Vrbnik
Tourist destinations on Krk, including Vrbnik
Cultural information on Krk, including Vrbnik
Municipality of Vrbnik

Municipalities of Croatia
Populated places in Primorje-Gorski Kotar County
Krk
Seaside resorts in Croatia

nl:Vrbnik